USS Clifton may refer to the following ships of the United States Navy:

 , a side-wheel gunboat of the American Civil War
 USS Clifton (ID-2080), a motorboat which served from 1917–1918
 , a station tanker which served from 1945–1946

See also
 , a guided missile frigate

References

United States Navy ship names